For the state pageant affiliated with Miss Teen USA, see Miss Wyoming Teen USA

The Miss Wyoming's Outstanding Teen competition is the pageant that selects the representative for the U.S. state of Wyoming in the Miss America's Outstanding Teen pageant.

Anna Mullinax of Sheridan was crowned Miss Wyoming's Outstanding Teen on June 25, 2022 at the WYO Theater in Sheridan, Wyoming. She competed at Miss America's Outstanding Teen 2023 at the Hyatt Regency Dallas in Dallas, Texas on August 12, 2022.

Results summary 
The results of Miss Wyoming's Outstanding Teen as they participated in the national Miss America's Outstanding Teen competition. The year in parentheses indicates the year of the Miss America's Outstanding Teen competition the award/placement was garnered.

Awards
 Spirit of America: Montana Sannes (2012)
 Miss Photogenic: Jessica Power (2013)

Winners

References

External links
 Official website

Wyoming
Wyoming culture
Women in Wyoming
2005 establishments in Wyoming